Charlie Rieves was a professional American football player who played linebacker for four seasons for the Oakland Raiders and Houston Oilers. He played a total of 38 games throughout his career.

References

1939 births
American football linebackers
Oakland Raiders players
Houston Oilers players
Houston Cougars football players
Living people
People from Stuttgart, Arkansas
American Football League players